"You Had Me from Hello" is a song co-written and recorded by American country music artist Kenny Chesney. It was released in April 1999 as the second single from his 1999 album Everywhere We Go. The song reached number one on the U.S. Billboard Hot Country Singles & Tracks (now Hot Country Songs) chart in September 1999. It  was also certified gold by the RIAA. Chesney wrote this song with Skip Ewing.

Background and writing
In 1996, Chesney and Skip Ewing saw the movie Jerry Maguire. In one of the film's most memorable scenes at the end of the movie, Tom Cruise's title character gives out a heartfelt speech to Renée Zellweger's character, Dorothy Boyd; Zellweger stops Cruise and tearfully says "You had me at 'hello'." Chesney liked that line and decided to write a song based on it. Chesney and Zellweger were later married for four months in 2005.

Chart performance
"You Had Me from Hello" debuted at number 71 on the U.S. Billboard Hot Country Singles & Tracks for the week of April 17, 1999.

Year-end charts

Certifications

References

1999 singles
Kenny Chesney songs
Songs written by Skip Ewing
Songs written by Kenny Chesney
Song recordings produced by Buddy Cannon
Song recordings produced by Norro Wilson
BNA Records singles
1999 songs